The Dyfed-Powys Police and Crime Commissioner is the police and crime commissioner, an elected official tasked with setting out the way crime is tackled by Dyfed-Powys Police in the Welsh counties of Dyfed and Powys. The post was created in November 2012, following an election held on 15 November 2012, and replaced the Dyfed-Powys Police Authority. The current incumbent is Dafydd Llywelyn, who represents Plaid Cymru.

List of Dyfed-Powys Police and Crime Commissioners

References

Police and crime commissioners in Wales